Cotoneaster integrifolius, the entire-leaved cotoneaster, is a species of Cotoneaster that is a low growing shrub. It has been grown as an ornamental plant in gardens and public rock gardens. It has been introduced to Ireland, but has become naturalised. It produces a red berry-like pome fruit that are an important food source for birds that disperse the seeds in their droppings. They are sometimes grown as a hedge for home security.

References

External links
Invasive Alien Species in Northern Ireland
British Database of Invasive Flora and Fauna

integrifolius
Garden plants
Bird food plants